This is a list of Namibians who are famous.

Artists

Visual artists

 Dieter Aschenborn, wildlife painter and designer of postal stamps
 Hans Aschenborn, wildlife painter and illustrator
 Uli Aschenborn, wildlife painter and sculptor
 Margaret Courtney-Clarke, documentary photographer
 Koos van Ellinckhuijzen (1942–2016), painter, designer of postal stamps and graphic designer
 Tony Figueira (1959–2017), photographer
 Joel Haikali, film director
 Oshosheni Hiveluah, film director and writer
 Tim Huebschle, film director and screenwriter
 Adolph Jentsch, painter
 Perivi Katjavivi, film director
 Helga Kohl, photographer
 Nicky Marais, painter
 Cecil Moller, film director
 Kerry McNamara (1940–2017), architect
 John Muafangejo (1943–1987), woodcutter and linocutter
 Richard Pakleppa, film director and screenwriter
 Bridget Pickering, film producer
 Wilhelm Sander (1860–1930), architect
 Max Siedentopf, artist

Literary artists

Joseph Diescho (born 1955), novelist
Dorian Haarhoff, poet
Mvula ya Nangolo, journalist and poet
Sylvia Schlettwein, literary critic and short story author
Christi Warner, performance poet, playwright

Performing artists

 Nǃxau ǂToma, bush farmer and actor
Atushe, Kizomba singer
Beate Baumgartner, pop singer
Sally Boss Madam, musician, songwriter
D-Naff, rapper
The Dogg, musician, songwriter
EES, rapper
Exit, musician
Gal Level, musician
Gazza, musician, songwriter
Jericho, rapper
Big Ben Kandukira, guitarist
Jackson Kaujeua, singer
Stefan Ludik, musician
Lady May, musician, dancer
Riana Nel, singer, songwriter
Nianell, musician
Franja du Plessis, pop singer, actress
Juanita du Plessis, country singer
Quido, rapper
Ras Sheehama, singer
Stella, pop singer
Sunny Boy, rapper, lyricist, songwriter
TeQuila, singer
Top Cheri, singer
Tre Van Die Kasie, kwaito singer
Christi Warner, singer, television presenter

Businesspeople 

 Tom Alweendo, Head of the National Planning Commission
 Tangeni Amupadhi, editor of The Namibian
 Johnny Doeseb, owner of Eleven Arrows F.C. in Walvis Bay
 Johannes ǃGawaxab, governor of the Bank of Namibia
 Monica Geingos, First Lady and owner of Stimulus Investments and many other companies
 Benjamin Hauwanga, owner of the BH Group of companies
 Frans Indongo, owner of Indongo Toyota, continental properties.
 Gert Joubert, owner of Erindi Game Reserve
 Robert Kahimise, CEO of the City of Windhoek
 Gwen Lister, journalist, founder of The Namibian
 Aaron Mushimba, mining magnate
 Martha Namundjebo-Tilahun, African Business Leader of the Year, 2013
 Harold Pupkewitz, owner of Pupkewitz Toyota, Megabuild, and many other companies
 Iipumbu Shiimi, minister of finance, former governor of the Bank of Namibia
 Sven Thieme, chairman of Ohlthaver & List
 Inge Zaamwani-Kamwi, managing director of diamond conglomerate Namdeb

Clergy 

 Leonard Auala (1908–1983), Christian bishop of Evangelical-Lutheran Ovambo-Kavango Church (ELOC)
 Shekutaamba Nambala, presiding bishop of the Evangelical-Lutheran Church in Namibia (ELCIN)
 Joseph Gotthardt (1880–1963), prefect of the Prefecture Apostolic of Cimbebasia, later bishop of the Apostolic Vicariate of Windhoek
 Paulus Hamutenya (died 1932), pastor in Ovamboland, ordained 1925
 Bonifatius Haushiku (1932–2002), archbishop of the Roman Catholic Archdiocese of Windhoek
 Obadja Iihuhua, pastor in Ovamboland, ordained 1925
 Sakeus Iihuhua, pastor in Ovamboland, ordained 1925
 Gideon Iitula, pastor in Ovamboland, ordained 1925
 Zephania Kameeta (born 1945), former bishop of the Evangelical Lutheran Church in the Republic of Namibia
 James Kauluma, sixth bishop of the Anglican Diocese of Namibia
 Nabot Manasse, pastor in Ovamboland, ordained 1925
 Leevi Gerson Max (1935–1997), pastor in Ovamboland, ordained 1965
 Ngeno Nakamhela (born 1945), former secretary-general of the Council of Churches in Namibia
 Juuso Ngaikukwete, pastor in Ovamboland, ordained 1925
 Matias Shikondomboro, pastor in Okavango, ordained 1942
 Simson Shituwa, pastor in Ovamboland, ordained 1925

Military leaders

Colonial period
 Jacob Morenga (1875–1907), guerrilla fighter, national hero

People's Liberation Army of Namibia personnel
 Tobias Hainyeko (1932–1967), commander of the South West Africa Liberation Army (SWALA), predecessor of PLAN, 1962–1967
 Lieutenant General Dimo Hamaambo  (1932–2002), commander of the People's Liberation Army of Namibia (PLAN) 1967–1990 and chief of the Namibian Defence Force (NDF) 1990–2000

Namibian Defence Force personnel

 Major General Matheus Alueendo (born 1961), Namibian Army commander since 2019
 Rear Admiral Alweendo Amungulu, (born 1963), Namibian Navy commander since 2020
 Lieutenant General Solomon Huwala, chief of the NDF 2000–2006
 Lieutenant General John Mutwa (1960–2021), chief of the NDF 2013–2020
 Major General Peter Nambundunga (1947–2019), Namibian Army commander 2005–2011
 Major General Charles Namoloh (born 1950), NDF Chief of Staff
 Lieutenant General Epaphras Denga Ndaitwah (born 1952), chief of the NDF 2011–2013
 Air Marshal Martin Pinehas (born 1962), chief of the NDF since 2020
 Air Vice Marshall Teofilus Shaende, Namibian Air Force commander since 2020
 Lieutenant General Martin Shalli (born 1954), chief of the NDF 2006–2011

Politicians

Presidents and leaders of government
 Sam Nujoma (SWAPO), first president of Namibia
 Hifikepunye Pohamba (SWAPO), second president
 Hage Geingob (SWAPO), first prime minister of Namibia and third president

 Nickey Iyambo (SWAPO), first vice-president of Namibia
 Nangolo Mbumba (SWAPO), second vice-president

 Theo-Ben Gurirab, second prime minister of Namibia
 Nahas Angula (SWAPO), third prime minister
 Saara Kuugongelwa-Amadhila (SWAPO), fourth prime minister

 Hendrik Witbooi (politician) (SWAPO), first deputy prime minister of Namibia
 Libertina Amathila (SWAPO), second deputy prime minister
 Marco Hausiku (SWAPO), third deputy prime minister
 Netumbo Nandi-Ndaitwah (SWAPO), fourth deputy prime minister

Diplomats

 Eddie Amkongo (SWAPO), former ambassador to Ethiopia
 Martin Andjaba (SWAPO), ambassador to Germany
 Bience Gawanas (SWAPO), African Union Labour Affairs Commissioner
 Neville Gertze (born 1966, SWAPO), ambassador to the United Nations
 Kaire Mbuende (SWAPO), former ambassador to the European Union, Belgium and Luxembourg
 Margaret Mensah-Williams (SWAPO), ambassador to the United States
 Monica Nashandi (SWAPO), former ambassador to the United States
 Hanno Rumpf (1958–2019, SWAPO), former ambassador to the Benelux countries, Switzerland and the European Union
 Nora Schimming-Chase (SWANU, CoD), former ambassador to Germany and Austria

SWAPO politicians

 Ben Amathila, cabinet member
 Clara Bohitile, deputy minister, central committee member
 Dawid Boois, former governor of ǁKaras
 Bernard Esau, trade unionist, independence activist
 Ella Kamanya, Pan-African parliamentarian and National Assembly member
 Asser Kuveri Kapere, chairman of the National Council of Namibia
 Marten Kapewasha, diplomat
 Samuel Mbambo, SWAPO central committee member
 Steve Mogotsi, National Council member
 Alpheus ǃNaruseb, cabinet member
 Immanuel Ngatjizeko, cabinet member
 Erkki Nghimtina, cabinet member
 Ngarikutuke Tjiriange, lawyer and cabinet member
 Andimba Toivo ya Toivo, former minister, independence leader
 Piet van der Walt, deputy minister
 Peya Mushelenga, member of parliament

Opposition politicians

 Kenneth Abrahams (NNF), medical doctor
 Ottilie Abrahams (NNF), activist, teacher and educator
 Steve Bezuidenhout (RDP)
 Moses Katjiuongua (NPF)
 Katuutire Kaura, (PDM)
 Fanuel Kozonguizi, (SWANU), first national ombudsman
 Dirk Mudge (RP), pre-independence leader of government
 Jeremia Nambinga, (RDP)
 Ben Ulenga (CoD)

Traditional leaders

 Justus ǁGaroëb (born 1942), Damara chief and politician
 Hosea Kutako (1870–1970), liberation fighter and Herero chief, national hero
 Samuel Maharero (1856–1923), Herero chief, national hero
 Daniel Sitentu Mpasi (1934–2014), king of the Kwangali
 Nehale Mpingana (died 1908), king of Ondonga, national hero
 Mandume ya Ndemufayo (1894–1917), king of the Kwanyama, national hero
 Martha Nelumbu (born 1930), queen of the Kwanyama
 Kahimemua Nguvauva (1850–1896), chief of the Ovambanderu, national hero
 Iipumbu Ya Tshilongo (1875–1959), king of the Uukwambi, national hero
 Hendrik Witbooi ( 1830–1905), chief of the ǀKhowesin, national hero

Activists

 Job Amupanda, youth activist who started the Affirmative Repositioning movement
 Niko Bessinger, independence activist and politician
 Pauline Dempers, human rights activist, coordinator of the Breaking the Wall of Silence movement
 Kalla Gertze, former president of the Breaking the Wall of Silence movement and CoD politician
 Alfredo Tjiurimo Hengari, political columnist
 Evilastus Kaaronda, trade unionist
 George Kambala, youth activist 
 Veronica de Klerk, women's rights activist
 John Kwedhi, trade unionist
 Blythe Loutit, founder of Save the Rhino Trust
 Anna Mungunda (1932–1959), anti-apartheid activists, national hero
 Rosa Namises, politician and women's rights activist, former member of parliament
 Phil ya Nangoloh, human rights activist
 Dimbulukeni Nauyoma, youth activist 
 John Pandeni, former trade unionist and member of cabinet
 Immanuel Shifidi, guerrilla fighter
 Emma Tuahepa, HIV/AIDS activist

Scientists 

 Roman Grynberg, professor of economics, University of Namibia (UNAM)
 Nico Horn, theologian and professor of human rights and constitutional law, UNAM
 André du Pisani (born (1949), professor of political science at UNAM
 Gabi Schneider (born (1956), geologist
 Tjama Tjivikua (born 1958), founding rector of the Polytechnic of Namibia

Sportspeople 

Gaby Ahrens (born 1981), Olympic trap shooter
Collin Benjamin (born 1978), footballer
Johanna Benson (born 1990), Paralympic athlete and medalist
Jacques Burger (born 1981), Rugby Union player
Dan Craven (born 1983), cyclist
Merlin Diamond (born 1991), sprinter, national champion
Trevor Dodds (born 1959), golfer
Frankie Fredericks (born 1967), Olympic athlete and medalist
Mannie Heymans (born 1971), cyclist
Kees Lensing (born 1978), rugby union prop
Beatrice Masilingi (born 2003), Olympic athlete, U20 world champion
Athiel Mbaha (born 1971), deaf footballer
Christine Mboma (born 2003), Olympic athlete
Ricardo Mannetti (born 1975), footballer and national football coach
Ali Nuumbembe (born 1978), welterweight boxer
Ryan Nyambe (born 1997), footballer
Harry Simon (born 1978), boxer
Razundara Tjikuzu (born 1979), footballer

Other 

Christina Van-Dunem Da Fonsech, police officer
Michelle McLean, former Miss Universe, charity activist
Behati Prinsloo, model
Robbie Savage, football fan and socialite
Hulda Shipanga, matron

References